Eric Santana Calvillo Ramirez (born 2 January 1998) is a professional footballer who plays as a midfielder for USL Championship club El Paso Locomotive. Born in the United States, he represents the El Salvador national team.

Club career

New York Cosmos
Calvillo signed with the New York Cosmos on January 15, 2016. He made 21 appearances and scored 4 goals for the NASL side, and was with the team, when it won the Soccer Bowl 2016 and was the runner-up for the Soccer Bowl 2017. He was the runner-up for the 2017 NASL Young Player of the Year.

San Jose Earthquakes
On January 20, 2018, the San Jose Earthquakes of MLS signed Calvillo to a multiyear contract. He was then sent to San Jose's USL affiliate, Reno 1868, on a temporary loan basis, and made his first appearance as a starter in Reno's 3–4 loss to Swope Park Rangers on March 17, 2018. Following the 2021 season, San Jose declined their contract option on Calvillo.

El Paso Locomotive
On January 11, 2022, Calvillo signed with USL Championship side, El Paso Locomotive. In the 2022 season, he made 31 appearances and scored 6 goals, including a direct free kick against Atlanta United II.

International career
Calvillo has appeared for the United States at the U-15, U-17, and U-19 levels. At the 2015 FIFA U-17 World Cup, he appeared on the 21-man roster, alongside Christian Pulisic, and captained the US squad at the 2016 U-19 Copa del Atlantico. He later chose to represent El Salvador and has since made eight appearances at the senior level.

Personal
Calvillo was born in the United States to a Mexican father and Salvadoran mother.

Statistics

Honours
Orange County SC
USL Championship: 2021

References

External links

MLS profile

1998 births
Living people
People from Palmdale, California
Salvadoran footballers
El Salvador youth international footballers
American soccer players
Salvadoran people of Mexican descent
American sportspeople of Salvadoran descent
American sportspeople of Mexican descent
Association football midfielders
El Paso Locomotive FC players
Major League Soccer players
New York Cosmos (2010) players
North American Soccer League players
Reno 1868 FC players
San Jose Earthquakes players
Soccer players from California
Sportspeople from Los Angeles County, California
Citizens of El Salvador through descent
El Salvador international footballers